Enilconazole (synonyms imazalil, chloramizole) is a fungicide widely used in agriculture, particularly in the growing of citrus fruits. Trade names include Freshgard, Fungaflor, and Nuzone.

Enilconazole is also used in veterinary medicine as a topical antimycotic.

History 
In 1983, enilconazole was first introduced by Janssen Pharmaceutica and it has since consistently been registered as an antifungal postharvest agent.  Shortly after its introduction, enilconazole was used for seed treatment in 1984 and later used in chicken hatcheries in 1990.  Like any fungicide, it was used to protect crops from becoming diseased and unable to yield a profitable harvest.  Today, it continues to be utilized as an agricultural aid for its contribution to maintaining crop integrity and production output.

Use on crops
Enilconazole is found on a wide variety of fruits and vegetables, but it is primarily used on tubers for storage.  Common fungi that are attracted to tubers are Fusarium spp, Phoma spp, and Helminthosporium solani which depreciate the crop quality.  In 1984, when enilconazole was initially used for seed treatment, barley was a main target to mitigate crop loss due to disease.

In addition, the antifungal agent is commonly used on citrus fruits.

In the EU its use as a fungicide is permitted within some limits and imported fruits may contain limited amounts.

Hazards 

In 1999, based on studies in rodents, enilconazole was identified as "likely to be carcinogenic in humans" under The Environmental Protection Agency's Draft Guidelines for Carcinogenic Assessment.  However, because pesticide residues are well below the concentrations associated with risk, the lifetime cancer risk estimate associated with citrus fruit contamination was valued as insignificant.

The EPA has established an equivalent toxicity level for human exposure at 6.1 x 10−2 mg/kg/day.  This level placed it in Category I, II, and IV for oral, dermal, and inhalation toxicity.  Category I is classified as highly irritating to the eyes, but not to the skin.  As for oral toxicity, when the fungicide is transferred via food into the body, it must be metabolized before it can do any damage.

Under California's Proposition 65, enilconazole is listed as "known to the State to cause cancer".

The EPA determined there is no substantial risk of enilconazole toxicity through food and water exposure.  Enilconazole has a very minute degree of mobility, so its level of drinking water contamination is quite low.  The estimated environmental concentration (EEC) found the levels to be 0.072 ppb for surface water, which is much less than the 500 ppb comparison level for drinking water.

References

External links
 Imazalil page at EnvironmentalChemistry.com
 Diagram showing metabolism of enilconazole
 Pesticide Residues in Food

Allyl compounds
Aromatase inhibitors
Chloroarenes
Ethers
Fungicides
Imidazole antifungals
Lanosterol 14α-demethylase inhibitors
Veterinary drugs